The Law Society of Scotland is the professional governing body for Scottish solicitors. It promotes excellence among solicitors through the support and regulation of its members. It also promotes the interests of the public in relation to the profession. The Society helps to shape the law for the benefit of both the public and the profession.

The Society was established by statute in 1949 and its rules are set out in the Solicitors (Scotland) Act 1980. All practising solicitors, currently around 10,500, are members. The Society is funded by its members and has an annual budget of almost £8 million.

History

Lawyers in Scotland have been organised in professional bodies since at least the sixteenth century. The Faculty of Advocates was established as the body for practising advocates in 1532, though its origins are thought to date from even earlier. Other lawyers were represented by associations and faculties of procurators and solicitors. Among those that still exist, the Society of Writers to Her Majesty's Signet (WS Society) was formally established in 1594 and the Royal Faculty of Procurators in Glasgow was incorporated before 1668.

As the legal profession expanded in line with the volume of legislation introduced in the twentieth century, it became clear that a representative body for all solicitors was needed along with reform of the informal system of lawyers voluntarily providing legal services to those who could not afford representation, which had existed since 1424. The Legal Aid and Solicitors (Scotland) Act 1949 established the Law Society of Scotland as the governing body for solicitors at the same time as it laid the foundation of the modern legal aid and assistance scheme.

Structure

Solicitors elect representatives to sit on the Society's Council, the ruling body. The council has overall responsibility for strategy and policy. The work of the council is supported by the management Board, which draws members from the Council and the Society's executive staff. This is the principal decision-making team at the Society.

The Society's president and the vice president hold office for one year. The current president is Murray Etherington, while Sheila Webster is the vice president. The other office bearers are the treasurer and immediate past president, Graham Watson and Ken Dalling respectively.  The chief executive is responsible for the day-to-day operations of the Society, working with a staff of approximately 120. The current chief executive is Diane McGiffen.

Most of the Society's departments are grouped in five main areas of work: regulation and standards; member services and engagement; education, training and qualifications; external relations; finance and operations. Other departments work within those areas. Policy is developed by teams in external relations and education, training and qualifications.

The work of the Society is supported by solicitors and non-solicitors who contribute their time and expertise through many committees and working groups.

From 2012 to 2014 the Society went through a process to reform its structures and governance. Some new committees and the management Board were established as part of this governance reform. A consultation on the composition and election of the council was held and a new constitution drafted.

See also
 Crown Office and Procurator Fiscal Service
 Law Society
 Law Society of Northern Ireland
 Lord President of the Court of Session
 Scots law
 Scottish Court Service
 Scottish Legal Aid Board
 The Law Society of England and Wales

References

External links
 

1949 establishments in Scotland
Scotland, Law Society of
Organisations based in Edinburgh
Scots law
Legal organisations based in Scotland
Organizations established in 1949
Regulators of Scotland